Ch'iyar Quta (Aymara ch'iyara black, quta lake, "black lake", also spelled Chiar Khota, Chiar Kkota, Chiar Kota, Chiar Quota,  Chiarcota, Chiarkhota, Chiarkkota) may refer to:

Lakes
 Ch'iyar Quta, Nor Lípez in the Nor Lípez Province, Potosí Department, Bolivia
 Ch'iyar Quta, La Paz in the Pucarani Municipality, Los Andes Province, La Paz Department, Bolivia
 Ch'iyar Quta, Oruro in the Curahuara de Carangas Municipality, Sajama Province, Oruro Department, Bolivia

Mountain 
 Ch'iyar Quta (Loayza), a mountain in the Loayza Province, La Paz Department, Bolivia